Baqcheh Jooq Palace is a palace located between the border towns of Maku and Bazargan in West Azarbaijan.

This palace was built at the end of Qajar dynasty under the orders of Iqbal-ol-Saltaneh Makui, one of the commanders of Mozafaredin Shah.

Being located on the main transit road between Turkey and Europe, it is visited by thousands of tourists annually.

External links

tourist information

Houses completed in the 19th century
Palaces in Iran
Architecture in Iran
Historic house museums in Iran
Tourist attractions in West Azerbaijan Province
Buildings and structures in West Azerbaijan Province
Maku County
Buildings of the Qajar period